JHE may refer to:

 John Hart Ely, American legal scholar
 Jacques-Henri Eyraud, a French businessman
 The Jimi Hendrix Experience, an English rock band fronted by Jimi Hendrix
 Juvenile-Hormone Esterase, an enzyme catalyzes the hydrolysis of juvenile hormone
 Journal of Hydraulic Engineering, an engineering journal published by the American Society of Civil Engineers
 Journal of Hydrologic Engineering, an engineering journal published by ASCE
 Journal of Humanitarian Engineering, an engineering journal published by Engineers without Borders Australia